Turenki is a population center in the municipality of Janakkala, Finland, with a population of some 7,500 people. It has been said that Turenki is translated from Turinge, Thuring or Turängi. It is among the largest population centers of Janakkala, along with Tervakoski.

History 
On 12 March 1940, the most destructive train accident in Finnish history happened in Turenki, where 39 people died and 69 got injured.

Locations 
Turenki contains the oldest railway station in Finland, built in the year 1862 as part of the Helsinki–Hämeenlinna Railway. It is also home to a factory owned by Valio Ltd., which produces mostly dairy products.

Notable individuals 

 Marko Nousiainen, fulltime twitch streamer
 Anssi Pesonen, ice hockey player
 Eino Kalpala, alpine skier
 Ellen Jokikunnas, model and television host
 Esko Helle, politician
 Janne Virtanen, athlete
 Jaryd Nousiainen
 Jarkko Kortesoja
 Kustaa Paturi, poet
 Laiska Leppone, rap musician
 Lyyli Aalto, Member of Parliament
 Tauno Marttinen, composer
 Veikko Lahti, athlete
 Tomi Hiukkamäki, musician
 Elektrus Erektus, performance artist

References

Janakkala
Villages in Finland